Dashan Pagoda is a pagoda in Shaoxing, Zhejiang Province, China. Originally built during the Song dynasty in 504, the tower has been destroyed and rebuilt many times. The current incarnation of the tower was built during the Qing dynasty in 1669, and renovated in 1957.

References 

Pagodas in China